Zamanlı (also, Zamanly) is a village in the Gadabay Rayon of Azerbaijan.  The village forms part of the municipality of Mormor.

References 

Populated places in Gadabay District